St Andrew's Academy is a Roman Catholic secondary school in Hawkhead, Paisley, Scotland. The school was opened in 1990, with its importance growing in 2001 when St Mirin's and St Margaret's High School closed. New buildings were completed in 2006. It has eight feeder primary schools in the town. The current headteacher is Mr Kevin Henry.

In 2008, the pupil roll was 1145. By 2017, this had risen to a full capacity of 1260, causing a situation when local children who applied to attend the school but were not in the associated primaries were subject to a ballot, with some being denied a place even when their older siblings were already pupils there.

Scottish Italian singer Paolo Nutini is a former pupil.

References

 S

External links
St Andrew's Academy

Catholic secondary schools in Renfrewshire
Schools in Paisley, Renfrewshire
1990 establishments in Scotland
School buildings completed in 2006
Educational institutions established in 1990